This is a list of the National Register of Historic Places listings in Hood County, Texas.

This is intended to be a complete list of properties and districts listed on the National Register of Historic Places in Hood County, Texas. There are one district and 3 individual properties listed on the National Register in the county. The district contains a State Antiquities Landmark district and several Recorded Texas Historic Landmarks. Both individually listed properties are also Recorded Texas Historic Landmarks.

Current listings

The locations of National Register properties and districts may be seen in a mapping service provided.

|}

See also

National Register of Historic Places listings in Texas
Recorded Texas Historic Landmarks in Hood County

References

External links

Hood County, Texas
Hood County
Buildings and structures in Hood County, Texas